Kim Han-Yoon (born 11 July 1974) is a South Korean football manager and former player. His previous clubs include FC Seoul, Bucheon SK (currently Jeju United FC), Pohang Steelers and Busan I'Park. He came out of retirement to sign as playing coach for Busan I'Park in April 2011, making his debut on 20 April 2011, and scoring in a 2–1 win for Busan over Sangju Sangmu Phoenix in the 2011 Rush & Cash Cup. Kim Han Yoon wrote himself into I'Park folklore with a winning goal in the dying minutes of the Rush Cash & Cup semi final against Suwon on 7 July 2011. In 2019, he assisted coach Park Hang-seo helping Vietnam win a gold medal at the 2019 Southeast Asian Games.

Club career statistics

External links
 
 
 National Team Player Record 

1974 births
Living people
Association football defenders
South Korean footballers
Jeju United FC players
Pohang Steelers players
FC Seoul players
FC Seoul non-playing staff
Busan IPark players
Seongnam FC players

K League 1 players
South Korea international footballers
Sportspeople from North Gyeongsang Province